Perryville High School may refer to:

 Perryville High School (Arkansas), Perryville, Arkansas
 Perryville High School (Maryland), Perryville, Maryland
 Perryville High School (Missouri), see Perry County 32 School District (Missouri)